This is a list of possessions of Sweden held outside of Sweden proper during the early modern period.

Fiefs 
Fiefs that were held for a limited time.
Scania (Agreement of Helsingborg, 1332–1360)
Hven (Agreement of Helsingborg, 1332–1360)
Blekinge (Agreement of Helsingborg, 1332–1360)
Halland (Treaty of Varberg, 1343–1360)
Elbing (Treaty of Altmark, 1629–1635)
Braunsberg (Treaty of Altmark, 1629–1635)
Pillau (Treaty of Altmark, 1629–1635)
Fischhausen (Treaty of Altmark, 1629–1635)
Lochstädt (Treaty of Altmark, 1629–1635)
Memel (Treaty of Altmark, 1629–1635)
Bremen (Recess of Stede, 1654–1666)
Bornholm (Treaty of Roskilde, 1658–1660)
Trøndelag (Treaty of Roskilde, 1658–1660)

Colonies 

Fort Apollonia, present Beyin: 1655–1657.
Fort Christiansborg/Fort Frederiksborg, which became the capital, present Osu: 1652–1658
Fort Batenstein, present Butri: 1650–1656.
Fort Witsen, present Takoradi: 1653–1658.
Carolusborg: April 1650 – January/February 1658, 10 December 1660- 22 April 1663
New Sweden on the banks of the Delaware River in North America: 1638–1655
Guadeloupe (1813–1814; returned to France)
Saint-Barthélemy (1784–1878; sold to France)

Mint Cities 
Cities, held outside the realm, where Swedish mints were established.
Stade (Saxony)
Osnabrück (Saxony)
Erfurt (Thuringia)
Mainz (Electorate of the Palatinate)
Würzburg (Bavaria)
Fürth (Bavaria)
Nuremberg (Bavaria)
Augsburg (Bavaria)
Elbing (Royal Prussia – part of Poland, 1626–1635 and 1655–1660)
Thorn (Royal Prussia – part of Poland, 1655–1658)

Territories held under Martial Law 
Strasburg, Prussia (conquest in the Polish War, held until 1629)
Dirschau, Prussia (conquest in the Polish War, held until 1629)
Wormditt, Prussia (conquest in the Polish War, held until 1629)
Mehlsack, Prussia (conquest in the Polish War, held until 1629)
Frauenburg, Prussia (conquest in the Polish War, held until 1629)
Marienburg, Prussia (conquest in the Polish War, held until 1629)
Stuhm, Prussia (conquest in the Polish War, held until 1629)
Danziger Haupt, Prussia (conquest in the Polish War, held until 1629)
Landsberg (agreement with Brandenburg, 1641–1643)
Frankfurt (Oder) (agreement with Brandenburg, 1641–1643)
Leipzig (agreement with Saxony, 1646–1648)
Memmingen (agreement with Bavaria, 1647–1648)
Überlingen (agreement with Bavaria, 1647–1648)

See also 
Swedish Empire
Swedish overseas colonies
Swedish colonization of the Americas
Lands of Sweden
Provinces of Sweden
Dominions of Sweden
Unions of Sweden
Thirty Years' War
History of Guadeloupe
History of Ghana
Swedish slave trade

External links 
 Mémoire St Barth | History of St Barthélemy (archives & history of slavery, slave trade and their abolition), Comité de Liaison et d'Application des Sources Historiques.

 
Sweden, possessions of
Sweden history-related lists